Tendu or Tendruk Gewog is a gewog (village block) of Samtse District, Bhutan.
The Tendruk Gewog comprises part of Sipsu Dungkhag (sub-district), together with Bara, Biru, Lehereni, and Sipsu Gewogs.

The Tendruk village is on a ridge near the confluence of the Bindu River with the Dichu (or Jaldhaka) River. The Indo-Bhutan border meets the Dichu near this point, with the west bank of Dichu being in India (Kalimpong district) and the east bank being in Bhutan. Thus, part of the Tendruk gewog lies on the border with India. A little below the confluence is the Bindu Dam over Dichu, which is said to be the second oldest dam in the Indian subcontinent. There is a border crossing to India over the dam.

It has 21 villages in 5 chiwogs. In 2012, it had a population of 6,175.

References

External links
 Tendruk Gewog marked on OpenStreetMap, retrieved 25 October 2021.

Gewogs of Bhutan
Samtse District